Taking Chances World Tour: The Concert is a home video/live album by Canadian singer Celine Dion. It was released by Columbia Records on 29 April 2010 in Australia and in early May 2010 in Europe and North America. The concert was issued as a DVD/CD combo in two editions: English-language Taking Chances World Tour: The Concert and French-language Tournée mondiale Taking Chances: le spectacle. Dion had embarked on the 2008–2009 Taking Chances World Tour for promotion of her 2007 studio album Taking Chances. It became one of the highest-grossing concert tours of all time. The performances in Boston and Montreal during the North American leg of Taking Chances World Tour were filmed for a video release and directed by Jean Lamoureux.

The release received positive reviews from music critics who praised Dion's stage presence, her powerful performances and chosen songs. It was also commercially successful. In Canada, Tournée mondiale Taking Chances: le spectacle was certified Diamond and Taking Chances World Tour: The Concert was awarded four-times Platinum. The DVD was also certified Platinum in the United States and the album received Gold certification in France. It topped the DVD charts in the United States and several European countries, and reached top ten around the world. In some countries, it entered the album charts peaking inside top ten in few of them, including number five in France.

Background
During the Taking Chances World Tour, Dion played concerts in five continents, 25 countries and 93 cities, selling more than three million tickets. Running from February 2008 through February 2009, featuring both Anglophone and Francophone setlists, the tour broke attendance and box office records at venues around the world. It was recorded in Boston and Montreal in 2008 and in April 2010, Dion's official website announced that Taking Chances World Tour: The Concert, a DVD/CD of live performances will be released on 4 May 2010 in Canada and on 11 May 2010 in the United States. This concert came alongside the DVD and Blu-ray release of Celine: Through the Eyes of the World, which was issued on the same date.

Content
The concert was released as a DVD/CD combo in both English (Taking Chances World Tour: The Concert) and French (Tournée mondiale Taking Chances: le spectacle). It was recorded at the TD Garden in Boston on 12 and 13 August 2008, and at the Bell Centre in Montreal on 31 August and 1 September 2008. For the songs performed in both English and French concerts, the vocals and footage appear the same on both DVDs (with the exception of "Pour que tu m'aimes encore," "My Love" and part of "My Heart Will Go On") as a mix of the Boston and Montreal performances. However, the two DVDs differ, as they each contain songs that were only included in the English-language or French-language setlists.

Surrounded by musicians and dancers, Dion performed her biggest hits and songs from her latest album, Taking Chances (2007). From the energetic opening track "I Drove All Night" to the grand finale ballad "My Heart Will Go On" encore, the concert includes over 100 minutes of performances of over 20 songs. It also features cover versions of Queen's "We Will Rock You" and "The Show Must Go On" and James Brown's "It's a Man's Man's Man's World". Although performed in Boston, "I'm Your Angel" was cut from the English DVD/CD. The same happened with "The Power of Love" on the French DVD. A special limited edition deluxe two-DVD set featuring both Celine: Through the Eyes of the World and Taking Chances World Tour: The Concert and a 52-page booklet and fold-out souvenir postcards was also released in mid-May 2010. QVC was also offering Celine: Through the Eyes of the World with a bonus CD, containing tracks which weren't included on the Taking Chances World Tour: The Concert CD: "I'm Alive," "Fade Away," "Pour que tu m'aimes encore," "We Will Rock You" and "The Show Must Go On".

Critical reception

Critical reception of Taking Chances World Tour: The Concert has been generally positive, with the Pink Paper rating the album 4 out 5 stars, stating that, "Taking Chances is Celine at her most dynamic. She effortlessly blends together medleys of material spanning the best part of two decades and even indulges in a few inspired cover versions that you'd never see coming. It's also easy to hear just how much energy is channelled into each and every song - you certainly won't find any filler tracks on this album". They also praised Dion's look on the DVD. Paul Cole of the Sunday Mercury rated the DVD positively, as well, exclaiming, "[...] Celine Dion has got it down to a fine art by now, and this live CD and DVD set is as predictable as it is polished. Big songs, carefully chosen covers, powerful performances, costume changes – you know the picture. [...] Love her or loathe her, it'll sell loads".

The Daily Herald gave a positive reviewing stating "Celine Dion has performed all over the world, and this great concert shows her in the many places that she has appeared. Her vocals are backed by a wonderful orchestra and she uses modern technology to enhance her concerts". Stephen Thomas Erlewine from AllMusic gave the album 3 out of 5 stars saying that Dion "gives the people what they want via a recitation of the expected hits in arrangements so splashy they sparkle even without the visuals". He also added: "If this doesn't sound like a good time, well, you're not the audience -- this is for the fans and they will be pleased".

Commercial performance
In Canada, Dion's new DVD releases debuted at the top three on the Nielsen SoundScan's Music Video Chart. Celine: Through the Eyes of the World entered at number one, selling 69,000 copies. Sales of this DVD achieved the second highest one week total for a music DVD, behind Dion's own, Live in Las Vegas: A New Day... (2007). Tournée mondiale Taking Chances: le spectacle entered the chart at number two with 31,000 units sold, followed by Taking Chances World Tour: The Concert at number three with sales of 8,000 copies. This was only the second time since 2004, after Hilary Duff, that an artist has held the top three positions on the Canadian Music Video Chart. On the same week, the number-one album on the Canadian Albums Chart has sold 7,100 units. This meant that Tournée mondiale Taking Chances: le spectacle would have ranked number one on the Canadian Albums Chart if it had charted there, and Taking Chances World Tour: The Concert would have been number two. With over 100,000 copies of all three DVDs sold in one week, Dion set an all-time record for music DVD sales in Canada. On 21 May 2010, CRIA certified all three releases: Celine: Through the Eyes of the World with two-times Diamond award for selling 200,000 copies, Tournée mondiale Taking Chances: le spectacle with Diamond for sales of 100,000 units and Taking Chances World Tour: The Concert with four-times Platinum for selling 40,000 copies.

In the United States, Dion entered the Billboards Top Music Video Sales chart at numbers one and two with Taking Chances World Tour: The Concert and Celine: Through the Eyes of the World, respectively. She became the first artist other than Bill and Gloria Gaither and the Gaither Vocal Band to manage a double-debut in the chart's two top spots. Taking Chances World Tour: The Concert has sold 26,000 copies in the first week and would have ranked number fourteen on the Billboard 200 if DVDs competed there. Celine: Through the Eyes of the World has sold 15,000 copies in its debut week in the United States. On 16 July 2010, RIAA certified Taking Chances World Tour: The Concert Platinum for shipping 100,000 copies and Celine: Through the Eyes of the World Gold for shipment of 50,000 units. On the Billboards 2010 Year-End Top Music Video Sales chart, Taking Chances World Tour: The Concert was placed at number ten and Celine: Through the Eyes of the World at number nineteen. According to Nielsen SoundScan, Taking Chances World Tour: The Concert has sold 76,000 copies in 2010 and Celine: Through the Eyes of the World ended the year with sales of 50,000 units in the United States. As of August 2012, Taking Chances World Tour: The Concert has sold 95,000 copies there.

Due to different chart rules, the DVD/CD combo of Taking Chances World Tour: The Concert entered the DVD charts in some countries and album charts in others. In addition to the high debut in Canada and the United States, it also reached the following positions on the DVD charts in other parts of the world: number one in Ireland, Switzerland and Japan (International Chart), number two in Finland, number three in Germany and Austria, number four in Australia and Sweden, and number six in Spain. On the album charts, Taking Chances World Tour: The Concert peaked at number one in Greece (International Chart), number two in Argentina and South Korea (International Chart), number eleven in the United Kingdom and the Netherlands, number eighteen in New Zealand, number twenty-four in Portugal, number twenty-nine in Italy and Czech Republic, and number thirty in Mexico. Besides Canada, the French edition entitled Tournée mondiale Taking Chances: le spectacle was also released in France and Belgium. It reached number five on the French Albums Chart and was certified Gold in July 2010 for selling 50,000 copies. It also charted on the album charts in Belgium Wallonia (peaking at number three) and Belgium Flanders (reaching number thirty). On the European Top 100 Albums, Taking Chances World Tour: The Concert peaked at number thirty and Tournée mondiale Taking Chances: le spectacle reached number thirty-nine.

Accolades

The French-language edition of the DVD/CD, entitled Tournée mondiale Taking Chances: le spectacle was nominated for a 2011 Juno Award in the Music DVD of the Year category but lost to Rush's Rush: Beyond the Lighted Stage.

Track listingNotes'''
  a 5-song concert exclusive CD was only available in the US with the QVC DVD order of Celine: Through the Eyes of the World.

Charts

Weekly charts

Year-end charts

Certifications and sales

!colspan=3|DVD
|-

!colspan=3|Album
|-

Release history

See alsoCeline: Through the Eyes of the World''
Taking Chances World Tour

References

External links

2010 live albums
2010 video albums
Celine Dion live albums
Celine Dion video albums
Live video albums